Yoon Young-ah (born March 15, 1987) is a South Korean actress. Yoon began her career as a child actress, notably in the children's fantasy show Magic Kid Masuri (2002). She began using the stage name Han Ye-in in 2007 when she transitioned to more adult supporting roles in television dramas such as Coffee Prince. In 2011, she reverted to using her real name when she appeared in Dream High.

Filmography

Television series

Music video

References

External links
Yoon Ji-yoo's blog at Naver

Yoon Ji-yoo's instagram at Instagram

1987 births
Living people
21st-century South Korean actresses
South Korean child actresses
South Korean television actresses
Sejong University alumni